Monet LLC, or "Monet Capital Investment Bank," is a Mongolian underwriting, brokerage and investment banking firm based in Ulaanbaatar, the country's capital city. Originally established as “Bats Invest” in 1997, it was one of the first companies to offer a full range of services in the Mongolian Stock Exchange.  It has grown steadily alongside Mongolia's developing economy, and now looks to prepare for the fresh investment that will follow the country's latest mining exploits.

History & Future
From 2009, it has expanded as one of Mongolia's few investment banks, creating investment funds and advisory services to attract foreign and domestic attention to the opportunities arising in Mongolia. With a recent strategic agreement with Renaissance Capital, the leading emerging market specialists, they plan to develop their operations to further encourage investment into Mongolia from outside their borders . Many have reported the upcoming boom in Mongolia's economy , and Monet aims to support and exploit this boom as one of the country's leading investment agencies.

Since 2007 it has acted as the lead underwriter for a number of IPOs and bond issuances, and in 2008 the MSE ranked the company in the top 5 out of 44 brokerage services in Mongolia. In the second half of 2009 it governed transactions of over MNT4.5 billion. At present it has over 3,000 customers for its brokerage and dealer services, and dominates approximately 4% of Mongolia's Brokerage and Dealing market and 9% of the Underwriting market.

External links
 Official website

Banks of Mongolia